Lai Tsui Court, former name Lai Chi Estate, is the second Green Form Subsidised Home Ownership Scheme (GFSHOS) court and a public rental housing (PRH) at the junction of Lai Chi Kok Road and Tonkin Street in Cheung Sha Wan of Sham Shui Po District. It was formerly the site of the demolished Cheung Sha Wan Estate and just next to MTR Cheung Sha Wan station and Fortune Estate.

GFSHOS part comprises 6 blocks (i.e. Blocks A to F) with totally 2,545 flats at the saleable areas ranging from about 17.1 square metres to about 42 square metres. By applying a discount of 58 per cent to assessed market values, the average selling price was HK$6,243 per square foot of saleable area. The selling price of the flats ranged from HK$932,500 to HK$3,062,100. All the flats were sold out in 2019.

Houses

Covid Pandemic
Lai Tong House was placed lockdown on 23 February 2022. Lai Pak House was sealed of for mandatory testing between 24 & 25 February.

Nearby Buildings
Cheung Sha Wan station
Fortune Estate
Un Chau Estate
Cheung Sha Wan Estate

References

Cheung Sha Wan
Home Ownership Scheme
Residential buildings completed in 2019
Public housing estates in Hong Kong
2019 establishments in Hong Kong